Chippy or Chippie may refer to:

Arts and entertainment
 Chippy (album), an album of songs from a play of the same name.
 Chippy (film), a 2017 Malayalam-language Indian film.
 Chippy (2019 video game), a bullet hell video game developed by Facepunch.
 Chippy (2013 video game), a time management video game produced by Glitchers.
The Tim and Eric Awesome Show, Great Job! used the word to name a gigantic baby with a mustache in season 1.

People
 Chippy (nickname)
 Chris Hipkins (born 1978) 41st and current Prime Minister of New Zealand, nicknamed "Chippy"
 Bertha Hill (1905–1950), American blues and vaudeville singer and dancer nicknamed "Chippie"
 Chippy (actress) (born 1975), Indian actress in Malayalam and Kannada films

Other uses
 Mrs Chippy, a cat that accompanied Ernest Shackleton's Imperial Trans-Antarctic Expedition of 1914–17
 Chippy, a brand of corn chips in the Philippines, made by Universal Robina
 Chippy, a slang term for a carpenter, in the List of words having different meanings in American and British English (A–L)
 Fish and chip shop, known colloquially in British English as a chippy

See also
 Chippi (disambiguation)
 Zippy Chippy, a racehorse that has lost over 100 races
 Chippie, a German former radio program
 Potato chip, known colloquially in the north of New Zealand as chippies
 Lowell Chippies, an American minor league baseball team which played in the New England League in 1888